Alafia multiflora is a plant in the family Apocynaceae.

Description
Its fragrant flowers feature a white corolla, often green outside.

Distribution and habitat
Alafia multiflora is native to an area of Africa from Liberia east to the Democratic Republic of the Congo and north to Egypt. Its habitat is riverine forest, from sea level to  altitude.

Uses
Local medicinal uses of Alafia multiflora include as a treatment for wounds, ulcers and abdominal pains. The plant has been used as arrow poison.

References

multiflora
Plants used in traditional African medicine
Flora of Africa
Plants described in 1894